The Triratna ( or ;  or ) is a Buddhist symbol, thought to visually represent the Three Jewels of Buddhism (the Buddha, the Dhamma, the Sangha).

Symbol
The Triratna symbol is composed of:

 A lotus flower within a circle.
 A diamond rod, or vajra.
 An ananda-chakra.
 A trident, or trisula, with three branches, representing the threefold jewels of Buddhism: Buddha, the Dhamma and the Sangha.

On representations of the footprint of the Buddha, the Triratna is usually also surmounted by the Dhamma wheel.

The Triratna can be found on frieze sculptures at Sanchi as the symbol crowning a flag standard (2nd century BCE), as a symbol of the Buddha installed on the Buddha's throne (2nd century BCE), as the crowning decorative symbol on the later gates at the stupa in Sanchi (2nd century CE), or, very often on the Buddha footprint (starting from the 1st century CE).

The triratna can be further reinforced by being surmounted with three dharma wheels (one for each of the three jewels of Buddhism: the Buddha, the Dhamma and the Sangha).

The triratna symbol is also called nandipada, or "bull's hoof", by Hindus.

Coins
A number of examples of the triratna symbol appear on historical coins of Buddhist kingdoms in the Indian subcontinent. For example, the triratna appears on the first century BCE coins of the Kuninda Kingdom in the northern Punjab. It also surmounts the depictions of stupas, on some the coins of Abdagases I of the Indo-Kingdom of the first century CE and on the coins of the Kushan Empire, such as those coined by Vima Kadphises, also of the first century.

Examples of Triratna

Notes

References
 Refuge : An Introduction to the Buddha, Dhamma, & Sangha. Thanissaro Bhikkhu : Third edition, revised, 2001
 "ガンダーラ美術の見方" (The art of Gandhara), Yamada Kihito,

External links

Buddhapada and Triratna
Another triratna on Buddha's footprint.

Buddhist symbols